Metin Yıldız (born 24 November 1960) is a retired Turkish football midfielder.

References

1960 births
Living people
Turkish footballers
Galatasaray S.K. footballers
Zonguldakspor footballers
Konyaspor footballers
Malatyaspor footballers
Adana Demirspor footballers
Zeytinburnuspor footballers
Kayserispor footballers
Mersin İdman Yurdu footballers
Association football midfielders
Turkey international footballers
Turkish football managers
Galatasaray S.K. (football) non-playing staff
Çaykur Rizespor managers
Sakaryaspor managers
Adana Demirspor managers
Adanaspor managers